Diogo Guimarães de Lana Castro (born 15 August 1985), also known as Diogo Guimarães or just Diogo, is a Brazilian futsal player who plays for FP Halle-Gooik. Despite being a futsal player Diogo was signed by the football club Charleroi in advance of the 2009–2010 season but was released by the club before the end of August 2009.

References

External links
Sporting CP profile

1985 births
Living people
Brazilian men's futsal players
R. Charleroi S.C. players
Minas Tênis Clube players
Sporting CP futsal players
Brazilian expatriate sportspeople in Belgium
Association football wingers
Brazilian footballers
Footballers from Belo Horizonte